John Ludvig (August 2, 2000) is a Czech-Canadian professional ice hockey defenseman who is currently playing with the Charlotte Checkers in the American Hockey League (AHL) as a prospect to the Florida Panthers of the National Hockey League (NHL).

Early life
Ludvig was born on August 2, 2000, in Liberec, Czech Republic,. to parents Jan and Charell. Ludvig was born into an athletic family; his father played for the New Jersey Devils and Buffalo Sabres in the National Hockey League and his sister Katie plays collegiate volleyball.

Playing career 
Growing up in British Columbia, Ludvig played defense for most of his youth hockey career but played the position of goaltender for a short period of time. As a defenseman, he played Junior B hockey and went undrafted in the Western Hockey League's (WHL) bantam draft at the age of 14 due to his size. As a result of his father's hockey background, Ludvig trained under his guidance in his backyard with weights, tires, and sledgehammers. Due to his training and offensive growth, Ludvig was placed on the Portland Winterhawks protected list at the age of 16.

Major junior
Leading up to the 2018 NHL Entry Draft, Ludvig was ranked 48th overall North American defenseman by the NHL Central Scouting Bureau. He was eventually drafted in 69th overall by the Florida Panthers on June 22, 2019, but was among the last of his family to find out due to the numerous messages and phone calls spamming his phone. Following the draft, he was invited to their Development Camp. Upon returning to the Winterhawks for the 2019–20 season, Ludvig was named the Winterhawks' 44th captain in team history. During his final season with the Winterhawks, Ludvig recorded 17 goals, fourth best among WHL defensemen, and 45 assists in 60 games and was selected for the WHL's Eastern Conference First All-Star Team. He was also credited by the Panthers for his physicality and penalty killing skills, along with success on the power play. Ludvig concluded his major junior career by signing an entry-level contract with the Panthers on March 30, 2020.

Professional
Following his major junior career, Ludvig joined the Florida Panthers Development Camp but was reassigned to their American Hockey League (AHL) affiliate, the Syracuse Crunch. While sports were paused due to the COVID-19 pandemic, Ludvig and his sister worked out together around five days a week with a trainer, including cardio sessions on the weekends.  Upon returning the Crunch for the 2020–21 season, Ludvig led all team defencemen in scoring with two goals and eight points in 13 games. He recorded his first professional goal, the game-winner, on March 1 against the Rochester Americans.

Awards and honours

References

External links
 

2000 births
Living people
Canadian ice hockey defencemen
Portland Winterhawks players
Ice hockey people from British Columbia
Syracuse Crunch players
Florida Panthers draft picks
Sportspeople from Kamloops
Canadian people of Czech descent
Canadian expatriate ice hockey players in the United States